The 1940 National Football League Draft was held on December 9, 1939, at the Schroeder Hotel in Milwaukee, Wisconsin. With the first overall pick of the draft, the Chicago Cardinals selected George Cafego.

Player selections

Round one

Round two

Round three

Round four

Round five

Round six

Round seven

Round eight

Round nine

Round ten

Round eleven

Round twelve

Round thirteen

Round fourteen

Round fifteen

Round sixteen

Round seventeen

Round eighteen

Round nineteen

Round twenty

Round twenty-one

Round twenty-two

Hall of Famers
 George McAfee, quarterback from Duke taken 1st round 2nd overall by the Philadelphia Eagles.
Inducted: Professional Football Hall of Fame class of 1966.
 Bulldog Turner, center from Hardin–Simmons taken 1st round 7th overall by the Chicago Bears.
Inducted: Professional Football Hall of Fame class of 1966.

Notable undrafted players

References

External links
 NFL.com – 1940 Draft
 databaseFootball.com – 1940 Draft
 Pro Football Hall of Fame

1940
Draft
NFL draft
December 1939 sports events
American football in Wisconsin
Sports in Milwaukee
Events in Milwaukee
20th century in Milwaukee